Batrachiderpeton is an extinct genus of nectridean lepospondyl within the family Diplocaulidae; it was a basal member of the family. The type species is B. reticulatum and was found in a coal field in Northumberland, England at a locality that also yields the remains of Anthracosaurus russelli. A second species is also known: B. lineatum.

See also
 Prehistoric amphibian
 List of prehistoric amphibians

References

Diplocaulids
Fossil taxa described in 1871
Carboniferous amphibians of Europe